is a Japanese manga series written and illustrated by Hisashi Eguchi. It was serialized in Shueisha's shōnen manga magazine Fresh Jump from 1984 to 1985.

Media

Manga
Written and illustrated by Hisashi Eguchi, Eiji was serialized in Shueisha's shōnen manga magazine  from 1984 to 1985. Shueisha collected its chapters in a single volume, which was released on July 15, 1985. It was followed by two short sequels; Eiji '85 and Eiji 2. Shueisha released a bunkoban edition, which included the previous stories, on February 18, 2004. Shogakukan re-released the series in a complete edition on August 2, 2010.

Original video animation
Eiji was adapted into a 45-minute original video animation (OVA) episode by I.G Tatsunoko and directed by Mizuho Nishikubo, released on August 25, 1990.

References

External links

Boxing in anime and manga
Comedy anime and manga
Production I.G
Shōnen manga
Shueisha manga